British Birds is a monthly  ornithology magazine that was established in 1907. It is now published by BB 2000 Ltd, which is wholly owned by The British Birds Charitable Trust (registered charity number 1089422), established for the benefit of British ornithology. Its circulation in 2000 was 5,250 copies; its circulation peaked at 11,000 in the late 1980s. The current editor is Stephen Menzie.

British Birds is aimed at serious birdwatchers and ornithologists, rather than the more casual birdwatchers catered for by some other magazines on the subject. It publishes the findings of the British Birds Rarities Committee.

Its mascot, and later logo, the red grouse, was chosen because at the time it was thought to be an endemic British species (although it is now considered a subspecies of the willow grouse).

In 1916, British Birds magazine absorbed The Zoologist, due to the latter's shortage of subscribers.

Editors 
The current editor of British Birds is Stephen Menzie.

Former editors:
 starting with volume 1 (1907): H.F. Witherby, assisted by W.P. Pycraft (until vol. 3)
 from volume 3 (1909), Witherby was further assisted by the Rev. F.C.R. Jourdain and Norman F. Ticehurst
 in volume 12 (1918), for one year, Jourdain was the editor, assisted by Ticehurst
 from volume 13 (1919) Witherby was back as the editor; this situation continued until volume 33 (1939), when Jourdain died.
 from volume 34 (1940) Bernard W. Tucker became assistant-editor

Numbering 
Before 1946, all volumes ran from June to May. Harry Witherby produced Vol.1 No.1 in June 1907 and produced 12 monthly issues per volume. It was finally decided to change with Volume 38, which ran from June 1944 to December 1945. Wartime paper restrictions meant that those issues were all pretty thin so it was possible to bind 19 into one volume.

The digital era 
In 2007 a DVD-ROM disk containing the first 100 years' worth of content (volumes 1–100) was released in conjunction with BirdGuides Ltd. Subsequent volumes are available as paid-for updates.

In 2010, the magazine launched a blog, Facebook group and a Twitter account.

From October 2011, the magazine's first 100 years' of back issues are available on-line, free. More recent issues are available to subscribers to the print edition.

See also
 List of ornithology journals

References

External links
 
 Issues from 1907–1923 on the Biodiversity Heritage Library

1907 establishments in the United Kingdom
Monthly magazines published in the United Kingdom
English-language magazines
Journals and magazines relating to birding and ornithology
Magazines established in 1907
Ornithology in the United Kingdom
Wildlife magazines